Live File System is the term Microsoft uses to describe the packet writing method of creating discs in Windows Vista and later, which allows writeable optical media to act like mass storage by replicating its file operations. Live File System lets users manage files on recordable and rewriteable optical discs inside the file manager with the familiar workflow known from mass storage media such as USB flash drives and external hard disk drives. 

Files can be added incrementally to the media, as well as modified, moved and deleted. These discs use the UDF file system. The supported UDF versions for usage as a live file system are UDF 1.50, UDF 2.00, UDF 2.01, UDF 2.50 for CD-R, CD-RW, DVD±R, DVD±RW and BD-RE, and UDF 2.60 for BD-R.

The Live File System option is used by default by AutoPlay when formatting/erasing a CD/DVD -R or -RW.

Compatibility 

Older Windows versions do not have support for reading the latest UDF versions. If users create DVD/CDs in Windows Vista using UDF 2.50, these may not be readable on other systems, including Windows XP and older (pre-Mac OS 10.5) Apple systems unless a third-party UDF reader driver is installed. To ensure compatibility of disks created on Windows Vista, UDF 2.01 or lower should be selected.

Notes

See also 
 InCD – Commonly used for packet writing before natively supported since Windows Vista
 Image Mastering API

References 

Computer storage media
Optical computer storage media
Windows disk file systems